Centrolepis polygyna, commonly known as wiry centrolepis, is a species of plant in the Restionaceae family and is found in Western Australia.

It blooms between July and December.

It is found in winter wet depressions and seepage areas in the Wheatbelt, Mid West, Peel, South West, Great Southern and Goldfields-Esperance regions of Western Australia where it grows in sandy-clay soils over laterite.

References

polygyna
Plants described in 1873
Flora of Western Australia
Poales of Australia